Bryce is a census-designated place in Graham County, Arizona, United States. Its population was 173 as of the 2020 census.
Bryce is located in the upper Gila River valley, approximately two miles north of Pima and north of the Gila River. The first settlement at Bryce was made in 1883. Bryce is named for settler and shipbuilder Ebenezer Bryce, a Mormon pioneer from Scotland, who is best known as the person that Bryce Canyon National Park is named after.

Demographics

Bryce first appeared on the 1920 U.S. Census as Bryce/Precinct 17 of Graham County and in 1930 as District 17. It reported a majority White population in 1930. With the combination of all Arizona county precincts and districts into three districts each in 1940, it did not formally appear again until 2010, when it was made a census-designated place (CDP).

References

Census-designated places in Graham County, Arizona